Dainis Bremze or Dainis Bremse (born 22 July 1954 in Riga) was a Latvian Soviet luger who competed during the late 1970s. He won the gold medal at the men's doubles event at the 1978 FIL World Luge Championships in Imst, Austria.

Bremze also won a bronze medal in the men's doubles event at the 1976 FIL European Luge Championships in Hammarstrand, Sweden.

At the 1976 Winter Olympics in Innsbruck, Bremze finished eighth in both the men's singles and men's doubles event.

References

Sources
Hickok sports information on World champions in luge and skeleton.
List of European luge champions 
Wallenchinsky, David. (1984). "Luge: Men's single" and "Luge: Men's two-seater". In The Complete Book the Olympics: 1896-1980. New York: Penguin Books. pp. 575–6.

1954 births
Living people
Lugers at the 1976 Winter Olympics
Lugers at the 1980 Winter Olympics
Latvian male lugers
Soviet male lugers
Olympic lugers of the Soviet Union
Sportspeople from Riga